Mykola Oleksandrovych Matviyenko (born 2 May 1996) is a Ukrainian professional football who plays as a centre-back or left back for Shakhtar Donetsk and the Ukraine national team.

Career
Matvienko was born in Saky, AR Crimea, Ukraine. He is a product of the FC Shakhtar Donetsk youth sportive school and signed a contract with the Ukrainian Premier League club in 2013.

He played three years for the Shakhtar Donetsk youth team in the Ukrainian Premier League Reserves Championship and in summer 2015 was promoted to the main-squad team in the Ukrainian Premier League. He made his debut for FC Shakhtar in a match against FC Chornomorets Odesa on 3 October 2015 in the Ukrainian Premier League.

Personal life 
His older brother Dmytro Matviyenko is also a professional football player. Since 2015 Dmytro plays in the Crimean Premier League.

Career statistics

Club

International

Honours
Shakhtar
Ukrainian Premier League: 2017–18, 2018–19
Ukrainian Cup: 2015–16, 2016–17, 2017–18, 2018–19
Ukrainian Super Cup: 2021

References

External links
 
 

1996 births
Living people
People from Saky
Ukrainian footballers
Ukraine youth international footballers
Ukraine under-21 international footballers
Ukraine international footballers
Association football defenders
FC Shakhtar Donetsk players
FC Karpaty Lviv players
FC Vorskla Poltava players
Ukrainian Premier League players
UEFA Euro 2020 players